WPOP (1410 AM) is a commercial radio station in Hartford, Connecticut, broadcasting a news/talk/sports radio format. The station is owned by iHeartMedia, Inc. The studios and offices are located on Columbus Boulevard in Hartford.

WPOP broadcasts at 5,000 watts. To protect other stations on AM 1410, it uses a directional antenna. The station's transmitter site is off Cedar Street in Newington, Connecticut. WPOP is also heard on the HD2 signal of co-owned WUCS 97.9 FM. A 220-watt FM translator simulcasts WPOP programming, W265EB at 100.9 MHz.

Programming
Weekdays begin with The Vinnie Penn Project, a wake-up talk and interview show shared with co-owned AM 960 WELI in New Haven, which also supplies Connecticut news briefs for WPOP. Also heard on weekdays are syndicated talk shows from Boston-based Howie Carr, as well as Mark Levin and Jesse Kelly.  Some daytime hours are supplied by Bloomberg Radio. Fox Sports Radio is heard overnights and several hours on weekends. Weekends also feature syndicated shows from Glenn Beck, Joe Pags, "At Home with Gary Sullivan," "Leo Laporte, The Tech Guy," "The Jesus Christ Show with Neil Saavedra" and "Handel on the Law with Bill Handel," all syndicated by Premiere Networks, co-owned with WPOP by iHeartMedia.

Two of Premiere's most successful syndicated weekday talk shows are not heard on WPOP because they are carried by talk radio rival AM 1080 WTIC: Sean Hannity and Coast to Coast AM with George Noory. Most hours on WPOP begin with world and national news from Fox News Radio.

WPOP carries Fox Sports Radio programming overnight and some hours on weekends. It is also the Hartford network affiliate for New York Yankees baseball and New York Jets football games. In the summer, WPOP carries Hartford Yard Goats Minor League Baseball games, and in winter, carries Bridgeport Sound Tigers and Hartford Wolf Pack American Hockey League games.

History
On June 28, 1935, the station first signed on at 1380 kilocycles as WMFE in New Britain, Connecticut, about 10 miles southwest of Hartford. The station, owned by the State Broadcasting Company, began as a daytimer powered at only 250 watts, although its power increased to 1,000 watts, operating full-time, several years later. The station was an affiliate of the NBC Blue Network and changed its call sign to WNBC in 1936.  (The station that would become better known as WNBC 660 AM in New York City carried the call letters WEAF at this time.)

In 1941, with the enactment of North American Regional Broadcasting Agreement (NARBA), the station switched to its present frequency of AM 1410. Power was boosted to the current 5,000 watts, and it moved its city of license to Hartford. It changed its call letters to WHTD to reflect its move to HarTforD, and became affiliated with the Mutual Broadcasting System. In 1956, as network programming moved from radio to television, WHTD switched to a middle of the road format.  It changed its call sign to WPOP, signifying that it played POPular music.

WPOP was a highly rated Top 40 radio station during the 1960s and early 1970s. The station achieved its highest level of success during this era, as it vied with rival 1360 WDRC for youthful listeners in the Hartford radio market. WPOP was acquired by entertainer and TV talk show host Merv Griffin in 1973, who also owned 104.1 WIOF (now WMRQ).

In June 1975, WPOP dropped its hit music format, switching to All-News, carrying NBC's News and Information Service, with a sizable local news staff covering Connecticut news stories. When the NIS network ended two years later, WPOP continued the All-News format using its own anchors supplemented by CBS Radio News and the Associated Press radio service. By the late 1980s, talk shows were added and the station cut back on its news segments. Affiliation switched from CBS Radio to ABC Radio's Information Network. In 1994, Merv Griffin sold the station to SFX Broadcasting, Inc., which also owned FM 105.9 WHCN.

On January 13, 1997, SFX Broadcasting switched WPOP's format to all-sports; most of its programming was provided by One-on-One Sports (now SB Nation Radio), but it also carried The Fabulous Sports Babe and weekend programming from the ESPN Radio Network, based in nearby Bristol, Connecticut. The station ended its One-on-One Sports affiliation on February 28, 1999, becoming a full-time ESPN Radio affiliate. In 2000, WPOP and WHCN were bought by Clear Channel Communications, the previous name of iHeartMedia, Inc. On January 27, 2012, WPOP's sports format began simulcasting on co-owned FM 97.9 WPKX, previously a country music outlet. The FM station eventually changed its call letters to WUCS, with the CS standing for Connecticut Sports. WPOP switched from ESPN Radio to Fox Sports Radio on March 5, 2012, with ESPN Radio remaining on WUCS.

On August 17, 2015, WPOP changed its format from all sports to a mix of talk and sports, branded as "News Radio 1410". In 2019, it added an FM translator, W265EB at 100.9 MHz, so listeners in Hartford and its adjacent suburbs could hear the station on FM as well as AM radio.

Previous logo

Translators

References

External links

History for WPOP
FCC History Cards for WPOP

POP
Radio stations established in 1935
1935 establishments in Connecticut
News and talk radio stations in the United States
IHeartMedia radio stations
Fox Sports Radio stations